Ang Mo Kio – Thye Hua Kwan Hospital (AMK-THKH) is a 370-bed community hospital in Ang Mo Kio, Singapore. As a community hospital, care is primarily focused on providing affordable rehabilitative and sub-acute care for geriatric patients. Admission is via referral. AMK-THKH does not have an emergency department.

The hospital, originally named Ang Mo Kio Community Hospital, was opened in June 1993. On 1 April 2002, the hospital, then managed by SingHealth, was transferred to be managed by the Thye Hua Kwan Moral Charities

Services

Ancillary
 Healing Hub (Pharmacy)  
 Lab/radiological services (managed by National Healthcare Group Diagnostics) 
 Dialysis Centre (managed by Ang Mo Kio - Thye Hua Kwan Hospital) 
 THK TCM Medical Centre

Milestones
1993:
Government established AMK Community Hospital

2002: 
Thye Hua Kwan Moral Society (THKMS) took over the Hospital from SingHealth

2003:  
First private hospital to put up isolation wards for patients recovering from SARS

2012:  
Partnership with THK to provide TCM Services
Increase capacity by 51 beds to 251 (including negative pressure isolation room)

2013:  
Partnership with B Braun
Opening of Healing Hub

2014:  
Opening of new South Wing – Increasing bed capacity by 110 beds to 360

References

External links

Hospitals in Singapore
Buildings and structures in Ang Mo Kio